Shadehill is an unincorporated community in Perkins County, in the U.S. state of South Dakota.

History
Shadehill was founded in 1916. The community is reportedly named after a nearby hill which, in turn, was named for a Col. L.M. Shade, who was a member of the State Highway Commission when South Dakota Highway 73 was being built through the vicinity.   A post office called Shadehill was established in 1918, and remained in operation until 1965.

Shadehill Dam and Shadehill Reservoir, completed in 1951, are near the town site.

References

Unincorporated communities in Perkins County, South Dakota
Unincorporated communities in South Dakota